The 2010 PTT Thailand Open was a tennis tournament played on indoor hard courts. It was the 8th edition of the Thailand Open, and was part of the ATP World Tour 250 Series of the 2010 ATP World Tour. It took place at the Impact Arena in Bangkok, Thailand, from September 27 through October 3, 2010.

Entrants

Seeds

 Seeds are based on the rankings of September 20, 2010.

Other entrants
The following players received wildcards into the singles main draw:
  Marc López
  Danai Udomchoke
  Fernando Verdasco

The following player received a Special Exempt into the singles main draw:
  Mischa Zverev

The following players received entry from the qualifying draw:
  Ruben Bemelmans
  Ryler DeHeart
  Konstantin Kravchuk
  Frederik Nielsen

Finals

Singles

 Guillermo García-López defeated  Jarkko Nieminen, 6–4, 3–6, 6–4.
 It was García-López' first title of the year, and the second of his career.

Doubles

 Christopher Kas /  Viktor Troicki defeated  Jonathan Erlich /  Jürgen Melzer, 6–4, 6–4.

External links
Official website

 
 ATP World Tour
Tennis, ATP World Tour, PTT Thailand Open
Tennis, ATP World Tour, PTT Thailand Open

Tennis, ATP World Tour, PTT Thailand Open
Tennis, ATP World Tour, PTT Thailand Open